Benjamin Langlois (1727–1802) was a British administrator and politician who sat in the House of Commons between 1768 and 1780.

Early life
Langlois was the fourth son of Peter L’Anglois, and his wife Julie de Monceau, daughter of Major-General Isaac de Monceau de la Melonière and was born on 7 January 1727. His father was a Huguenot refugee who was naturalized in 1707, and later became a merchant at Livorno. Langlois matriculated at Christ Church, Oxford on 23 March 1745. There he was a contemporary of  Lord Stormont  and subsequently went with him to Warsaw in June 1756 in an unofficial capacity. In 1759  he travelled with Marquess of Titchfield later Duke of Portland through Germany to Italy, spent a year in Turin, and went on to Florence. When Stormont was appointed ambassador to Vienna in 1763, Langlois went with him as Secretary of the embassy.

Political career
Another of Langlois' friends was Edward Eliot, who had an interest in six parliamentary seats. He offered Langlois the seat at St Germans where he had a vacancy to fill in 1768. Langlois was returned as Member of Parliament for  St. Germans at the   1768 general election but did not sit in Parliament until he left Vienna in 1771. He, was given the post of Clerk of the Deliveries of the Ordnance  in 1773. At the 1774 general election  he was returned again for St Germans. In 1778 he was promoted to Storekeeper of the Ordnance and when Stormont was appointed secretary of state for the Northern Department in October 1779, joined him as  under-secretary of state. He held his place at the Ordnance until September 1780, when he was made a Lord of Trade. He complained about the loss of income and was dropped by Eliot at the  1780 general election. However he kept both offices even though he was not in Parliament. He stopped attending the Board of Trade at the end of April 1781 and left it in January 1782. He lost his place at the Northern Department on the fall of the North Government in March  1782.

Later years
In later years Langlois was staying with Portland much of the time at Welbeck Abbey.  Sir Gilbert Elliot described him in 1788 as  ”the same diplomatic, old-fashioned coxcomb as ever, and favoured us with a good deal of prose, of and concerning himself and his own consequence; but he is, with all this, an inoffensive and polite man.” Sir Egerton Brydges described him as “a good and benevolent old man, with much diplomatic experience, but most fatiguingly ceremonious, with abilities not much above the common”. Langlois died unmarried on 20 November 1802 leaving £22,000

References

  

1727 births
1802 deaths
Alumni of Christ Church, Oxford
Members of the Parliament of Great Britain for English constituencies
British MPs 1768–1774
British MPs 1774–1780